Wen Wei Po is a pro-Beijing state-owned newspaper based in Hong Kong. The newspaper was established in Hong Kong on 9 September 1948, 10 years after the launch of its Shanghai counterpart in 1938.

Its head office is located at the Hing Wai Centre in Aberdeen, Hong Kong.

The paper is owned by Ta Kung Wen Wei Media Group, which is controlled by the liaison office of the Chinese government in Hong Kong. Wen Wei Po is subsidised by and advocates for the Chinese government. Wen Wei Po accounts for less than 1 percent of Hong Kong's readership, and is mainly read by an audience in mainland China and older Hong Kong readers.

In a 2019 public opinion survey conducted by the Chinese University of Hong Kong, Wen Wei Po was rated by respondents as the second least credible paid newspaper in Hong Kong.

History 
Wen Wei Po was founded in Shanghai in January 1938. The Hong Kong edition was first published on 6 September 1948.

In the 1980s, Xinhua News Agency, which served as the de facto Chinese embassy to Hong Kong, reduced its control over Wen Wei Po to reflect China's guarantee of "one country, two systems" after sovereignty over Hong Kong is transferred to China in 1997. In 1989, Wen Wei Po published an editorial that criticised the People's Liberation Army for their crackdown of protesters in Tiananmen Square. Lee Tze-chung, the president of the newspaper since 1951, was dismissed, and editor-in-chief Kam Yiu-yu went into exile in the United States. Following the dismissals, Wen Wei Po received financial support from the Chinese government to repair the image of China following the military crackdown in Beijing.

Content

Editorial position 
Wen Wei Po has been described as pro-China and leftist.

According to The Challenge of Hong Kong's Reintegration With China, a book written by Ming K. Chan, Wen Wei Po is a "mouthpiece" of the Chinese government.

Space and military news
Wen Wei Po is known to periodically leak first hand information about the PRC's space program and military buildup. Examples of this occurring include the advanced launch date of the Shenzhou 7 mission.

See also

 Media of Hong Kong
 Ta Kung Pao (大公報)
 Wenhui-Xinmin United Press Group (文汇新民联合报业集团)
 Shanghai Xinmin Evening News (新民晚报)

References

External links
 (Hong Kong version of Wen Wei Po)

Chinese-language newspapers published in Hong Kong
Newspapers established in the 1940s
Chinese propaganda organisations
1948 establishments in Hong Kong
Propaganda newspapers and magazines
Publications established in 1948